This article concerns the period 219 BC – 210 BC.

References